Tawhid Hridoy (born 4 December 2000) is a Bangladeshi cricketer. He made his first-class debut for Rajshahi Division in the 2017–18 National Cricket League on 13 October 2017.

In December 2017, he was named in Bangladesh's squad for the 2018 Under-19 Cricket World Cup. He made his List A debut for Shinepukur Cricket Club in the 2017–18 Dhaka Premier Division Cricket League on 5 February 2018.

In October 2018, he was named in the squad for the Sylhet Sixers team, following the draft for the 2018–19 Bangladesh Premier League. He made his Twenty20 debut for Sylhet Sixers in the 2018–19 Bangladesh Premier League on 6 January 2019. In December 2019, he was named as the vice-captain of Bangladesh's squad for the 2020 Under-19 Cricket World Cup. In February 2021, he was selected in the Bangladesh Emerging squad for their home series against the Ireland Wolves.

In December 2021, during the 2021–22 Bangladesh Cricket League, Hridoy scored his maiden double century in first-class cricket, scoring 217 runs.

In March 2023, Hridoy scored run 92 off 85 ball is the highest individual innings on ODI debut by a Bangladeshi batsman.

International career
In February 2023, he was named in Bangladesh's One Day International (ODI) squad for their series against England. In March 2023, he was named in Twenty20 International (T20I) squad for the same series. He made his T20I, debut in the first T20I of the series, on 9 March 2023. He made his ODI debut against Ireland, on 18 March 2023. Hridoy went on to score 92 runs, which was the highest individual score by a Bangladeshi player on his ODI debut.

References

External links
 

2000 births
Living people
Bangladeshi cricketers
People from Bogra District
Rajshahi Division cricketers
Sylhet Strikers cricketers
Shinepukur Cricket Club cricketers
Bangladesh One Day International cricketers